Theonellamide F is an antifungal isolate of a sea sponge.

References

Antifungals
Bromoarenes